Theodore William Richards (January 31, 1868 – April 2, 1928) was the first American scientist to receive the Nobel Prize in Chemistry, earning the award "in recognition of his exact determinations of the atomic weights of a large number of the chemical elements."

Biography 

Theodore Richards was born in Germantown, Pennsylvania, to William Trost Richards, a land- and seascape painter, and Anna Matlack Richards, a poet.  Richards received most of his pre-college education from his mother.  During one summer's stay at Newport, Rhode Island, Richards met Professor Josiah Parsons Cooke of Harvard, who showed the young boy Saturn's rings through a small telescope.  Years later Cooke and Richards would work together in Cooke's laboratory.

Beginning in 1878, the Richards family spent two years in Europe, largely in England, where Theodore Richards' scientific interests grew stronger.  After the family's return to the United States, he entered Haverford College, Pennsylvania in 1883 at the age of 14, earning a Bachelor of Science degree in 1885. He then enrolled at Harvard University and received a Bachelor of Arts degree in 1886, as further preparation for graduate studies.

Richards continued on at Harvard, taking as his dissertation topic the determination of the atomic weight of oxygen relative to hydrogen.  His doctoral advisor was Josiah Parsons Cooke.  Following a year of post-doctoral work in Germany, where he studied under Victor Meyer at the University of Göttingen and others, Richards returned to Harvard as an assistant in chemistry, then instructor, assistant professor, and finally full professor in 1901. In 1903 he became chairman of the Department of Chemistry at Harvard, and in 1912 he was appointed Erving Professor of Chemistry and Director of the new Wolcott Gibbs Memorial Laboratory.

In 1896, Richards married Miriam Stuart Thayer.  The couple had one daughter, Grace Thayer (who married James Bryant Conant), and two sons, Greenough Thayer and William Theodore.  Both sons died by suicide.

Richards maintained interests in both art and music.  Among his recreations were sketching, golf, and sailing. He died at Cambridge, Massachusetts, on April 2, 1928, at the age of 60.  According to one of his descendants, Richards suffered from "chronic respiratory problems and a prolonged depression."

He was a Quaker.

Scientific research

About half of Richards's scientific research concerned atomic weights, starting in 1886 with his graduate studies. On returning to Harvard in 1889, this was his first line of research, continuing up to his death.  According to Forbes, by 1932 the atomic weights of 55 elements had been studied by Richards and his students. Among the potential sources of error Richards uncovered in such determinations was the tendency of certain salts to occlude gases or foreign solutes on precipitation. As an example of the care Richards used in his work, Emsley reports that he carried out 15,000 recrystallizations of thulium bromate in order to obtain the pure element thulium for an atomic weight measurement.

Richards was the first to show, by chemical analysis, that an element could have different atomic weights. He was asked to analyze samples of naturally occurring lead and lead produced by radioactive decay.  His measurements showed that the two samples had different atomic weights, supporting the concepts of isotopes.

Although Richards's chemical determinations of atomic weights were highly significant for their time, they have largely been superseded.  Modern scientists use electronic instrumentation, such as mass spectrometers, to determine both the masses and the abundances of an element's isotopes.  From this information, an average atomic mass can be calculated, and compared to the values measured by Richards.  The modern methods are faster and more sensitive than those on which Richards had to rely, but not necessarily less expensive.

Other scientific work of Theodore Richards included investigations of the compressibilities of atoms, heats of solution and neutralization, and the electrochemistry of amalgams.  His investigation of electrochemical potentials at low temperatures was among the work that led, in the hands of others, to the Nernst heat theorem and the Third law of thermodynamics, although not without heated debate between Nernst and Richards.

Richards also is credited with the invention of the adiabatic calorimeter as well as the nephelometer, which was devised for his work on the atomic weight of strontium.

Legacy and honors 

 Member of the American Philosophical Society (1902)
Lowell Lectures (1908)
 Davy Medal (1910)
 Faraday Lectureship (1911)
 Willard Gibbs Medal (1912)
 President of the American Chemical Society (1914)
 Nobel Prize in Chemistry (1914)
 Franklin Medal (1916)
 President of the American Association for the Advancement of Science (1917)
 Honorary Member of the Royal Irish Academy (1918)
 Foreign Member of the Royal Society of London (1919)
 President of the American Academy of Arts and Sciences President (1919 – 1921)
 Lavoisier Medal (1922)
 Le Blanc Medal (1922)
 Honorary Fellow of the Royal Society of Edinburgh (1923)
 Member of the International Atomic Weights Committee
 Theodore Richards Medal (1932, awarded posthumously)

Selected writings

See also 

 Mass spectrometry
 Jöns Jakob Berzelius
 Farrington Daniels
 Gilbert Newton Lewis
 Jean Stas
 Theodore W. Richards House

References

Further reading

External links 

  including the Nobel Lecture, December 6, 1919 Atomic Weights
 Theodore Richards Medal

1868 births
1928 deaths
American physical chemists
Haverford College alumni
Harvard University alumni
Harvard University faculty
Nobel laureates in Chemistry
American Nobel laureates
History of chemistry
Faraday Lecturers
Foreign Members of the Royal Society
Scientists from Philadelphia
American Quakers
Members of the American Philosophical Society